British Standard Pipe (BSP) is a set of technical standards for screw threads that has been adopted internationally for interconnecting and sealing pipes and fittings by mating an external (male) thread with an internal (female) thread. It has been adopted as standard in plumbing and pipe fitting, except in North America, where NPT and related threads are used.

Types

Two types of threads are distinguished:
 Parallel (straight) threads, British Standard Pipe Parallel thread (BSPP; originally also known as British Standard Pipe Fitting thread/BSPF and British Standard Pipe Mechanical thread/BSPM), which have a constant diameter; denoted by the letter G.
 Taper threads, British Standard Pipe Taper thread (BSPT), whose diameter increases or decreases along the length of the thread; denoted by the letter R.

These can be combined into two types of joints:
 Jointing threads These are pipe threads where pressure-tightness is made through the mating of two threads together. They always use a taper male thread, but can have either parallel or taper female threads. (In Europe, taper female pipe threads are not commonly used.)
 Longscrew threads These are parallel pipe threads used where a pressure-tight joint is achieved by the compression of a soft material (such as an o-ring seal or a washer) between the end face of the male thread and a socket or nipple face, with the tightening of a backnut.

Thread form
The thread form follows the British Standard Whitworth standard:

 Symmetrical V-thread in which the angle between the flanks is 55° (measured in an axial plane)
 One-sixth of this sharp V is truncated at the top and the bottom
 The threads are rounded equally at crests and roots by circular arcs ending tangentially with the flanks where r ≈ 0.1373P
 The theoretical depth of the thread is therefore 0.6403 times the nominal pitch h ≈ 0.6403P

Pipe thread sizes

At least 41 thread sizes have been defined, ranging from 1⁄16 to 18, although of these only 15 are included in ISO 7 and 24 in ISO 228.  The size number was originally based on the inner diameter (measured in inches) of a steel tube for which the thread was intended, but contemporary pipes tend to use thinner walls to save material, and thus have an inner diameter larger than this nominal size.  In the modern standard metric version, it is simply a size number, where listed diameter size is the major outer diameter of the external thread. For a taper thread, it is the diameter at the "gauge length" (plus/minus one thread pitch) from the small end of the thread. The taper is 1:16, meaning that for each 16 units of measurement increase in the distance from the end, the diameter increases by 1 unit of measurement.

These standard pipe threads are formally referred to by the following sequence of blocks:
 the words, Pipe thread,
 the document number of the standard (e.g., ISO 7 or EN 10226)
 the symbol for the pipe thread type:
 G, external and internal parallel (ISO 228)
 R, external taper (ISO 7)
 Rp, internal parallel (ISO 7/1)
 Rc, internal taper (ISO 7)
 Rs, external parallel
 the thread size

Threads are normally right-hand. For left-hand threads, the letters, LH, are appended.

Example: Pipe thread EN 10226 Rp 

The terminology for the use of G and R originated from Germany (G for gas, as it was originally designed for use on gas pipes; R for rohr, meaning pipe.)

Pipe and fastener dimensions

ISO 7 (Pressure Tight threads)
The standard ISO 7 - Pipe threads where pressure-tight joints are made on the threads consists of the following parts:
 ISO 7-1:1994 Dimensions, tolerances and designation
 ISO 7-2:2000 Verification by means of limit gauges

ISO 228 (Non Pressure Tight Threads)
The standard ISO 228 - Pipe threads where pressure-tight joints are not made on the threads consists of the following parts:
 ISO 228-1:2000 Dimensions, tolerances and designation
 ISO 228-2:1987 Verification by means of limit gauges

See also

 AN thread
 British standard brass thread
 British Standard Whitworth
 Garden hose thread
 National pipe thread
 Panzergewinde
 Thread angle
 Threaded pipe

References

External links 
British Standard Pipe Parallel Thread Dimensions
British Standard Pipe Taper Thread Dimensions
BSP Thread Charts and Diagrams, showing dimensions of tubing and fittings
ISO 7-1:1994
ISO 7-2:2000
ISO 228-1:2000
ISO 228-2:1987
Parallel pipe threads G
Parallel pipe threads PF

Thread standards
Piping
Plumbing
British Standards